Patricia Duggin she is a British karateka. She is the winner of multiple European Karate Championships and World Karate Championships Karate medals.

Achievements

 1994  European Karate Championships Bronze Medal
 1995  European Karate Championships Bronze Medal
 1996  World Karate Championships  Kumite  Gold Medal
 1997  World Games  Kumite Bronze Medal
 1998  European Karate Championships Kumite Silver Medal

References

Living people
English female karateka
Wadō-ryū practitioners
Karate coaches
Black British sportswomen
World Games bronze medalists
Competitors at the 1997 World Games
Year of birth missing (living people)